Cheshmeh Kabud (also Romanized as Cheshmeh Kabūd) is a village in Cheshmeh Kabud Rural District, in the Central District of Harsin County, Kermanshah Province, Iran. At the 2006 census, its population was 1,589, in 301 families.

References 

Populated places in Harsin County